Judge Rinder's Crime Stories is a British reality television show that has aired daily on ITV since 20 June 2016. It is hosted by Robert Rinder.

Background
Most episodes feature two stories, and features reconstructions and interviews with families, witnesses and officers involved in the cases.

Transmissions

References

External links
 

2016 British television series debuts
2010s British crime television series
2010s British legal television series
2010s British reality television series
2020s British crime television series
2020s British legal television series
2020s British reality television series
English-language television shows
ITV reality television shows
Television series by ITV Studios